The Way of the World is a 1920 British silent drama film directed by A. E. Coleby and starring Coleby, Gordon Coghill and Charles Vane.

Cast
 A. E. Coleby as Seth Langton  
 Gordon Coghill as Dick Jefferson  
 Charles Vane as Marshall  
 Babs Ronald as Angela, as a child  
 Cherry Hardy as Angela Barton  
 Sargeant Stanley as Bill Swayne  
 Olive Bell as Landlady  
 Henry Nicholls-Bates as Landlord  
 Humberston Wright as Manager

References

Bibliography
 Palmer, Scott. British Film Actors' Credits, 1895-1987. McFarland, 1998.

External links
 

1920 films
1920 drama films
British drama films
British silent feature films
Films directed by A. E. Coleby
British black-and-white films
1920s English-language films
1920s British films
Silent drama films